Hassan Honarmandi (March 22, 1928 - September 17, 2002) was an Iranian writer, poet and translator. Born in Taleqan, Iran, he died by suicide in Paris.

References

1928 births
2002 deaths
20th-century Iranian poets